Rajaldesar is a City and a Tehsil in Churu District in the Indian State of Rajasthan. Rajaldesar is well connected through Indian Railways.

Geography
It has an Average Elevation of 318 Metres (1026 Feet). 

Temperature of the region in Winter is about -1 °C to 10 °C and in Summer 25 °C to 47 °C.

Demographics
 India Census, Rajaldesar had a Population of 22,837. Males constitute 51% of the Population and Females 49%. Rajaldesar has an Average Literacy Rate of 55%, lower than the National Average of 59.5%: Male Literacy is 60%, and Female Literacy is 36%. In Rajaldesar, 19% of the population is under 6 Years of Age.
The name of this Village is on
Bikaner's ruler His Highness Gangbahadur Maharaja Ganga Singh's Mother Rajal Bai.

References
 

 Cities and towns in Churu district